Neighbors is a 1981 American black comedy film based on the novel of the same name by Thomas Berger. It was released through Columbia Pictures, was directed by John G. Avildsen, and starred John Belushi, Dan Aykroyd, Cathy Moriarty, and Kathryn Walker. The film takes liberties with Berger's story and features a more upbeat ending. The screenplay of the film is officially credited to Larry Gelbart, although it was extensively rewritten to Gelbart's public disapproval. Released two and a half months before Belushi's death, the film marks his last film performance.

Plot
Low-key, ineffectual, middle-class suburbanite Earl Keese's peaceful, dreary life changes when a younger couple, Vic and Ramona Zeck, move in next door. Upon arrival, the Zecks immediately impose themselves on the Keese household, with Earl infuriated with the loud, gung-ho Vic, and flustered by the sly and seductive Ramona. Earl is frustratingly unable to handle them, and can never produce any proof that the couple are deliberately doing anything wrong. Earl's wife Enid and teenage daughter Elaine are unhelpful, and one night, the antagonism between Earl and the Zecks escalates into suburban warfare. Initially questioning his family's sanity, Earl soon realizes that the Zecks have provided him with the most excitement he's had in years and that they can give him a promising future, apart from suburbia and away from his family. In the film's closing scene, Earl joins the couple, abandoning his family and his burning house.

Cast
 John Belushi as Earl Keese
 Dan Aykroyd as Victor "Vic" Zeck
 Cathy Moriarty as Ramona Zeck
 Kathryn Walker as Enid Keese
 Igors Gavon as Chic
 Dru-Ann Chuckran as Chic's Wife
 Tim Kazurinsky as Pa Greavy
 Tino Insana as Perry Greavy
 P. L. Brown as Police Officer #1
 Henry Judd Baker as Police Officer #2
 Lauren-Marie Taylor as Elaine Keese
 Sherman G. Lloyd as Fireman #1 (DOC)
 Bert Kittel as Fireman #2
 J. B. Friend as Additional Fireman
 Bernie Friedman as Additional Fireman

Production
Thomas Berger's best-selling novel, Neighbors, was published in 1980. Columbia Pictures acquired the rights to film the novel and assembled a high-profile cast and crew: Richard D. Zanuck and David Brown had produced Jaws (1975); John G. Avildsen had won an Academy Award for directing Rocky (1976); veteran comedy writer Larry Gelbart had developed the hit TV series M*A*S*H (1972-1983); and John Belushi and Dan Aykroyd had been stars of TV's Saturday Night Live (on which they appeared from 1975-1979) and the film The Blues Brothers (1980). The film's female leads were played by Cathy Moriarty, who had made her film debut in Martin Scorsese's Raging Bull (1980), and Kathryn Walker, who had been the girlfriend of Belushi's National Lampoon colleague Douglas Kenney (1946-1980).
 
The production of Neighbors was troubled. John Belushi and Dan Aykroyd switched their roles in pre-production, acting against type (usual-wild man Belushi played the meek Earl and usual-straight-arrow Aykroyd played the obnoxious Vic). Belushi and Aykroyd also argued constantly with director John G. Avildsen (as they believed that he had no understanding of comedy), and lobbied to have him removed from the picture. Belushi wanted either Aykroyd, himself or John Landis to direct the film. Avildsen also argued with producers Richard D. Zanuck and David Brown, and screenwriter Larry Gelbart objected to the changes made to his screenplay by Dan Aykroyd. John Belushi's drug problems also impaired the film's production, and Neighbors proved to be Belushi's final film before he died of a drug overdose.

Tom Scott was originally assigned to compose the score for Neighbors but was replaced by Avildsen's frequent collaborator Bill Conti. John Belushi unsuccessfully tried to have the film finish with a song written and performed by the punk rock group Fear (Belushi had discovered the band and brought them to Cherokee Studios to record songs for the film). Music producing partners Steve Cropper and Bruce Robb remember recording the band's music, but nobody knows exactly what happened with the final soundtrack which was ultimately replaced in the film by Conti's more traditional movie score. "How can I describe what it was like recording in the early days of punk?" said music producer and Cherokee owner Bruce Robb. "We had decided to track the song selection in order, and were on track 4 before the band realized they were all using different set lists. The irony is we couldn't tell." Upset with Belushi's antics and believing that Fear's music was inappropriate for Neighbors, the movie studio eventually forced the band off the soundtrack project. To make up for it, Belushi got them a guest spot on Saturday Night Live.

A comprehensive look at the troubled production of Neighbors can be found in the books Wired: The Short Life and Fast Times of John Belushi by Bob Woodward (1984) and Belushi: A Biography by Judith Belushi Pisano and Tanner Colby (2005).

Release

Critical reception
For one test version of the film, the head of Columbia Pictures, Frank Price, made the contentious decision to have quotations from positive press reviews of Berger's book assembled into a caption that would serve as a prologue to the film (this move prompted an angry missive from Dan Aykroyd). The final version of Neighbors was released to cinemas in December 1981. Although Neighbors was not a commercial flop, it received mixed reaction from both critics and from some fans of Belushi and Aykroyd, who did not like that they played the complete opposite character types that they usually would.

David Ansen, writing for Newsweek Magazine, wrote:

Roger Ebert, reviewing for the Chicago Sun-Times, awarded the film three stars out of four, and wrote that "Neighbors is a truly interesting comedy, an offbeat experiment in hallucinatory black humor. It grows on you." Ebert also wrote approvingly of Belushi and Aykroyd as the leads, citing it as "brilliant casting, especially since they divided the roles somewhat against our expectations." In his book Guide for the Film Fanatic, Danny Peary wrote, "I think this surreal comedy is imaginatively done, and perfectly conveys the lunacy of the two comics...I'm glad they went against type because both actors are at their absolute best." Peary argued that the "final picture is faithful to Thomas Berger's zany, satirical novel" but noted that he prefers "the film's happier ending."

Neighbors holds a 57% rating on Rotten Tomatoes based on seven reviews.

Soundtrack
In December 2007, Varèse Sarabande released the Neighbors soundtrack on CD. The CD contains the score by Bill Conti as heard in the film (tracks 1-30), as well as the unused score by Tom Scott (tracks 31-49).

While the film features the songs "Hello, I Love You" by The Doors, "Holiday In Cambodia" by Dead Kennedys, and "Stayin' Alive" by the Bee Gees, none of the songs are included on the soundtrack album.

References

External links

 
 

1981 films
American black comedy films
1980s black comedy films
Columbia Pictures films
Films scored by Bill Conti
Films based on American novels
Films shot in New York City
Films directed by John G. Avildsen
Films with screenplays by Larry Gelbart
Films produced by Richard D. Zanuck
Films produced by David Brown
Films based on works by Thomas Berger (novelist)
1981 comedy films
1980s English-language films
1980s American films